Miika Huczkowski (born August 25, 1982) is a Finnish former ice hockey player who played professionally in Finland for JYP Jyväskylä, Blues Espoo and TPS of the SM-liiga from season of 2001 until season of 2012.

Career statistics

References

External links

Living people
Espoo Blues players
HC TPS players
JYP Jyväskylä players
1982 births
Finnish ice hockey defencemen
Sportspeople from Jyväskylä
21st-century Finnish people